Abbas Bolaghi may refer to:
 Abbas Bolaghi, Chaypareh
 Abbas Bolaghi, Shahin Dezh